Yanamarey (possibly from Quechua yana black, maran, maray batan or grindstone, maray to tear down, to knock down, "black batan or grindstone") or Yanaraju is a mountain in the Cordillera Blanca in the Andes of Peru, about  high. It is located between Recuay and Huari provinces, in Ancash. Yanamaray lies east of Pucaraju and northeast of Lake Querococha, between Matashcu in the north and Cahuish in the south.

The Yanamaray River originates west of the mountain. It provides Qiruqucha with the melt water of the Yanamarey glacier before it empties into Santa River.

Annual observations have shown that the Yanamarey glacier has been rapidly retreating over the last years.

See also 
 Waraqayuq

References 

Mountains of Peru
Mountains of Ancash Region
Glaciers of Ancash Region